Silesian Library, is one of the most modern libraries in Poland, and is located in the south-western city of Katowice, Silesia.

External links
Biblioteka Slaska

Buildings and structures in Katowice
Libraries in Poland
Tourist attractions in Silesian Voivodeship
Recipients of the Silver Medal for Merit to Culture – Gloria Artis
Commanders of the Order of Polonia Restituta